St Peter's College is a private, anglican, and English medium co-educational high school situated in the municipality of Sandton in Johannesburg in the Gauteng province of South Africa.

History 

St Peter's College was founded in 1998 as a response to the shortage of independent high schools in the area.

The college was opened under a former headmaster of St Alban's College, Ronnie Todd, who was later succeeded by Graham Howarth, who served for 12 years. Rui Morais, who was appointed headmaster in December 2015, joined the college in January 2003.

Schools in Johannesburg
Anglican schools in South Africa
Private schools in Gauteng
Christianity in Johannesburg